Terapanth or Tera Panth may refer to:

 Digambara Terapanth, a sect of the Digambara tradition of Jainism
 Shvetambara Terapanth, a sect of Shvetambara Jainism

See also
 Taran Panth, another Digambar Jain sect, should not be confused with Terapanth